Eugène Rutagarama is an environmentalist from Rwanda. He was awarded the Goldman Environmental Prize in 2001, for his efforts on saving the population of mountain gorillas in the Volcanoes National Park in the Virungas mountains, during the war and recent conflicts in the Democratic Republic of Congo.

References

Year of birth missing (living people)
Rwandan environmentalists
Living people
Goldman Environmental Prize awardees